The Colt Commander is a single-action, semi-automatic, magazine-fed, and recoil-operated handgun based on the John M. Browning–designed M1911. It was the first mass-produced American pistol with an aluminium alloy frame and the first Colt pistol to be chambered in 9mm Parabellum.

Colt made several variations of the Commander and offered it in .45 ACP and .38 Super chamberings. Other variants followed with different degrees of factory accurizing and materials.

History
The pistol that would eventually be named the Colt Commander was Colt's Manufacturing Company's candidate in a U.S. government post–World War II trial to find a lighter replacement for the M1911 pistol that would be issued to officers. Requirements were issued in 1949 that the pistol had to be chambered for 9 mm Parabellum and could not exceed 7 inches in length or weigh more than 25 ounces.

Candidates included Browning Hi-Power variants by Canada's Inglis and Belgium's Fabrique Nationale, and Smith & Wesson's S&W Model 39. Colt entered a modified version of their M1911 pistol that was chambered for 9 mm Parabellum, had an aluminum alloy frame, a short 4.25-inch barrel, and a 9-round magazine. In 1950, Colt moved their candidate into regular production. It was the first aluminum-framed large frame pistol in major production and the first Colt pistol to be originally chambered in 9 mm Parabellum.  The first year's production included .45 ACP and .38 Super chamberings.

In 1970, Colt introduced the all-steel "Colt Combat Commander", with an optional model in satin nickel. To differentiate between the two models, the aluminum-framed model was renamed the "Lightweight Commander".

Variants
The .45 ACP "Colt Commander Gold Cup" was designed to offer competition-ready out-of-the-box performance in National Match competition. It came with one 8-round magazine plus a separate recoil spring and one 7-round magazine for wadcutter ammunition.

The "Colt Combat Elite" was  specialized for combat-style match shooters. The .45 ACP model comes with two 8-round magazines and the .38 Super model with two 9-round magazines.

The "C.C.O." or "Concealed Carry Officer's" pistol mated the slide and barrel assembly of the stainless-steel Commander with the shorter frame of the blued Lightweight Officer's ACP.

A limited run of the Colt Commander in 7.65mm Luger was made for export in the early 1970s.

References

External links
 Official Safety and Instruction Manual (PDF; archived from Colt)

.45 ACP semi-automatic pistols
9mm Parabellum semi-automatic pistols
1911 platform
Colt semi-automatic pistols
Police weapons
Semi-automatic pistols of the United States